Puconci  (in older sources also Pucinci, Prekmurje Slovene: Püconci) is a town in the Prekmurje region in northeastern Slovenia. It is the seat of the Municipality of Puconci. Prior to 1920 it was known as Battyánd.

Church

There is a Lutheran church in the middle of the settlement, built in 1784, the first Lutheran church in the region of Prekmurje. It was rebuilt and restyled in 1909.

Notable people
Prominent natives and residents of Puconci include the writers István Lülik, Sándor Terplán, Rudolf Czipott, and Ferenc Berke, and the politician Feri Horvat.

References

External links
  Puconci on Geopedia

Populated places in the Municipality of Puconci
Prekmurje